Jennifer Judy "JJ" Heller (born October 19, 1980, née Kellner) is an American Christian folk singer. After releasing multiple albums, she had two songs that charted. "Your Hands" from her 2008 album Painted Red and "What Love Really Means" from the album When I'm with You both peaked at number 13.

Career
Heller grew up in San Jose, California in a family with strong Christian values. She didn't listen to music much as a child. She attended high school at Valley Christian High School and then went on to attend college at San Jose Christian College (now William Jessup University) and began writing songs in her second year. She joined a band which played at coffee shops in the area; the band included her future husband Dave Heller. He continues to collaborate with writing, recording and producing her works.

Heller released multiple albums before she had her first chart appearance in 2009. Her song "Your Hands", from her album Painted Red hit number 13 on the Billboard Christian Songs chart.

Heller released her next album When I'm with You in 2010 and it charted, peaking at number 33 on Billboards Christian Albums. She released "What Love Really Means" as the first single from the album and it peaked at number 13 on the Billboard Singles chart. In 2011 she released her Deeper album, which is a collection of acoustic songs, which were put aside to allow her to release the more pop-oriented When I'm with You. When I'm With You was covered by Jennifer Love Hewitt's character Riley Parks on Season 2 Episode 6 of The Client List entitled "Unanswered Prayers". The shortened cover was released on iTunes on April 9, 2013.

Heller released Loved on March 12, 2013. Her song "Control" was featured on Season 7 Episode 19 of One Tree Hill.

Musical style
She credits Damien Rice and Patty Griffin as influences to her style. AllMusic describes her sound as being comparable with Jewel, Alison Krauss, Sara Groves and Griffin.

Discography

Albums

References:

Singles

References:

Guest appearances

References

External links

1980 births
Musicians from San Jose, California
Living people
American women singer-songwriters
American performers of Christian music
Singer-songwriters from California
21st-century American singers
21st-century American women singers